Nicolaas (Nikala) "Nik" Scholtz (born 5 February 1991) is a professional tennis player from Greyton, South Africa.  Nicolaas qualified for the 2011 SA Tennis Open.

Scholtz is the son of Calla Scholtz, a former rugby player who represented Western Province in South Africa's domestic competition, the Currie Cup, from 1982 to 1989 (a total of 116 matches).

In 2012, Nicolaas represented South Africa in their Davis Cup play-off against Canada for a spot in the much esteemed World Group. He faced world number fifteen, Milos Raonic, in his first and only match, losing 5–7, 4–6, 5–7. South Africa lost the tie 4–1. In total he played seven ties for South Africa, producing a 5–7 singles record.

After spending his childhood in Greyton, a small town in the Boland, Western Cape, Nicolaas' family moved to Caledon and he attended Paarl Boys High School. He completed his studies at the University of Mississippi in the United States in 2015, earning four All-American colours four times. He is currently playing on the ITF Futures tour.

Scholtz has represented South Africa at the Davis Cup where he has a W/L record of 5–8.

Scholtz is currently South Africa's third ranked tennis player behind Kevin Anderson and Lloyd Harris.

Tennis Career Highlights

Juniors

In March 2008, Scholtz won his first ITF junior singles title at the G2 in Gaborone, Botswana.

As a junior, Scholtz reached a Career High Combined ranking of 22 in the International Tennis Federation's world junior ranking.

As a junior, he compiled a singles win–loss record of 67–27.

Junior Grand Slam results – Singles:

 Australian Open: 1R (2009) 
 French Open: 2R (2009) 
 Wimbledon: 1R (2009) 
 US Open: 1R (2009)

Junior Grand Slam results – Doubles:

 Australian Open: 1R (2009) 
 French Open: QF (2009) 
 Wimbledon: 1R (2009)
 US Open: 1R (2009)

ATP Challenger and ITF Futures finals

Singles: 20 (13 titles-7 runner-ups)

Doubles: 24 (12 titles- 12 runner-ups)

References

http://www.supersport.com

External links
 
 
 

1991 births
Living people
People from Theewaterskloof Local Municipality
South African male tennis players
Afrikaner people
Ole Miss Rebels men's tennis players